This is a list of music awards and nominations received by Nigerian singer Wizkid.

The singer contribution to the international music industry have earned him several achievements, including a Grammy Awards thanks to his featured work in Beyoncé's The Lion King: The Gift soundtrack with "Brown Skin Girl". He is the most awarded African artist at the BET Awards (4), Soul Train Awards (3), Billboard Awards (3), iHeartRadio Music Awards (2) and MOBO Awards (4). He is also a recipient of an ASCAP plaque for Drake's "One Dance". Wizkid's contributions to the Nigerian music industry has made him the most awarded artiste in The Headies award history.

Music Awards

References

 

Wizkid